Robert Paul Allen (born November 14, 1978) is an American former professional ice hockey defenseman who played in the National Hockey League for the Edmonton Oilers and the Boston Bruins.

Playing career
As a youth, Allen played in the 1991 and 1992 Quebec International Pee-Wee Hockey Tournaments with a minor ice hockey team from Beverly, Massachusetts.

Allen played for Boston College, from which he was selected fifty-second in the 1998 NHL Entry Draft by the Boston Bruins.  He was subsequently traded to the Edmonton Oilers on the 2002 trade deadline, in exchange for Sean Brown. He spent the majority of his Oiler career in the American Hockey League, although he did play one game for Edmonton in 2002–03.

On July 22, 2004 he signed as a free agent by the New Jersey Devils. Allen never played with the Devils due to the NHL Lockout. He was assigned to the Albany River Rats, of the AHL.

On July 17, 2006, Allen was signed as a free agent by hometown team, the Boston Bruins, to a one-year deal. Allen was assigned to start the 2006–07 season with Boston's AHL affiliate, the Providence Bruins. He spent the first half of the season with Providence before playing his first NHL game in 5 years with the Bruins on January 17, 2007 against the Buffalo Sabres. Allen's physical play earned him a spot with the Bruins for the remaining half of the season. On July 6, 2007, after testing free agency Allen re-signed with the Bruins to a one-year contract for the 2007–08 season.

Allen only managed to play in only 19 games over the season with the Bruins as he was hampered by a back injury. Prior to the 2008–09 season Allen was diagnosed with two herniated discs in his back and has been unable to play since.

Personal
Allen was born in Weymouth, Massachusetts raised in Hull, Massachusetts, attended Cushing Academy and currently lives in Hingham, Massachusetts with his wife Natalie, a teacher at the Hingham High School, and their son their daughter.

Career statistics

Awards and honors

References

External links

1978 births
Albany River Rats players
American men's ice hockey defensemen
Boston Bruins players
Boston Bruins draft picks
Boston College Eagles men's ice hockey players
Edmonton Oilers players
Hamilton Bulldogs (AHL) players
Ice hockey players from Massachusetts
Living people
People from Hull, Massachusetts
Sportspeople from Weymouth, Massachusetts
Sportspeople from Plymouth County, Massachusetts
Providence Bruins players
Toronto Roadrunners players
AHCA Division I men's ice hockey All-Americans
NCAA men's ice hockey national champions